The Suffolk Transnational Law Review is a triannual law review published at Suffolk University Law School (Boston, Massachusetts). It covers contemporary international legal issues. It was established in 1976. The journal is organized and operated by students.

The journal also hosts speakers and symposiums on international law, as well as an annual international moot court competition.

The journal staff consists entirely of second and third year law students from Suffolk University Law School.  Law students, who are eligible based on first year academic achievement, may become a member  either through an automatic bid or through the annual write-on competition. Staff members in their first year write Notes, Book Reviews, or Case Comments. A Note is an in-depth legal analysis of an international legal issue. A Case Comment studies a recent international law decision in detail and analyzes the context of the holding and the decision's potential impact. The editorial board is composed of members in their second year with the journal who supervise and edit staff members' works.

References

External links

American law journals
Suffolk University Law School
Law journals edited by students
Publications established in 1976
Triannual journals
English-language journals